Sanabares of Parthia was a rival king of the Parthian Empire from ca. 50 to 65.  There is not much known about Sanabares, except from a few coins witnessing to his rule as a Parthian king, with his capital in the city of Merv for about fifteen years. This much we owe to the dates known from certain coins of Sanabares. He was rival to Gotarzes II of Parthia (reigned 40–51), Vonones II of Parthia (reigned 51), Vologases I of Parthia (reigned 51–78) and Vardanes II of Parthia (reigned 55–58).

Sources 
  F. Chiesa: Osservazione sulla monetazione Indo-Partica. Sanabares I e Sanabares II incertezze ed ipotesie in Festschrift Herbert A. Cahn zum 70. Geburtstag, München 1982, S. 15-22

65 deaths
Parthian kings
1st-century monarchs in the Middle East
Year of birth unknown
1st-century Iranian people